William Cochran may refer to:

 William Cochran (clergyman) (1757–1833), first president of University of King's College
 William Thad Cochran (born 1937), U.S. Senator from Mississippi
 William Gemmell Cochran (1909–1980), British-American statistician
 William Granville Cochran (1844–1932), American judge and politician
 William Cochran (physicist) (1922–2003), British physicist
 William Cochran (tenor) (born 1943), operatic tenor
 William D. Cochran (1894–1951), American football player
 William D. Cochran (astronomer) (born 1950), American astronomer 
 William Cochran (artist) (1738–1785), Scottish painter
 William Cochran (Nova Scotia politician) (1751–1820), Irish-born merchant and political figure in Nova Scotia
 William Cochran (Indiana politician) (1934–2019), American politician and businessman
 William Cochran (clergyman) (1757–1833), Canadian clergyman

See also
 William Cochrane (disambiguation)